Alchornea is a plant genus of the family Euphorbiaceae first described as a genus in 1788. It is widespread in tropical and subtropical regions of Africa, South Asia, Australia, Latin America, and various oceanic islands. Molecular phylogenetic analyses suggest that Bocquillonia from New Caledonia is nested in Alchornea.

Species

formerly included
moved to other genera (Aparisthmium Cleidion Cnesmone Discocleidion Discoglypremna Necepsia Neoscortechinia Orfilea  Sampantaea Trigonostemon Wetria )

References

Alchorneae
Euphorbiaceae genera
Taxa named by Olof Swartz